Bob Altelaar (born 7 July 1976), also known as Bobbie Altelaar, is a Dutch former professional tennis player.

Altelaar, who comes from Amsterdam, competed best as a doubles player on the international tour, with a career high ranking of 183. In 2001 he partnered with Dennis van Scheppingen to win the Sylt Challenger tournament.

Challenger/Futures titles

Doubles

References

External links
 
 

1976 births
Living people
Dutch male tennis players
Tennis players from Amsterdam
20th-century Dutch people
21st-century Dutch people